Marios Georgiou (Greek: Μάριος Γεωργίου) (born 10 November 1997) is a Greek Cypriot male artistic gymnast, representing his nation in international competitions. He qualified as a lone gymnast on the Cypriot squad for the 2016 Summer Olympics by securing one of the spots available at the Olympic Test Event in Rio de Janeiro.

Marios won golds in the floor and parallel bars disciplines and the bronze medal in the individual all-around event at the 2018 Commonwealth Games.

He has qualified to represent Cyprus at the 2020 Summer Olympics in the men's artistic gymnastics all-around event.

Recently in 2022 Marios won 3 golds in all individuals around event at the world challenge cup

Early life
Marios Georgiou was born in Cyprus and is the son of a Cypriot father and a Filipina mother.

References

External links 
 

1997 births
Living people
Cypriot male artistic gymnasts
Sportspeople from Limassol
Gymnasts at the 2014 Summer Youth Olympics
Gymnasts at the 2016 Summer Olympics
Olympic gymnasts of Cyprus
Gymnasts at the 2018 Commonwealth Games
Commonwealth Games medallists in gymnastics
Commonwealth Games gold medallists for Cyprus
Commonwealth Games bronze medallists for Cyprus
Competitors at the 2018 Mediterranean Games
Mediterranean Games gold medalists for Cyprus
Mediterranean Games silver medalists for Cyprus
Mediterranean Games bronze medalists for Cyprus
Mediterranean Games medalists in gymnastics
Gymnasts at the 2015 European Games
Gymnasts at the 2019 European Games
European Games medalists in gymnastics
European Games silver medalists for Cyprus
Gymnasts at the 2020 Summer Olympics
Gymnasts at the 2022 Commonwealth Games
European champions in gymnastics
Medallists at the 2022 Commonwealth Games